Miracle's Boys is an American drama television series produced for Noggin's teen programming block, The N. The show began production in June 2004 and first previewed on December 17, 2004, with a behind-the-scenes special called "The Making of a Mini-Series." The show made its official debut on February 18, 2005.

It is based on the 2000 novel of the same name by Jacqueline Woodson. The series was directed by Spike Lee, Ernest Dickerson, Neema Barnette, Bill Duke, and LeVar Burton. It was filmed on-site in Harlem, New York, and includes a theme song by rapper Nas.

Miracle's Boys was nominated for five different categories at the 2006 Black Reel Awards, and it was the recipient of a Writers' Guild of America Award for Best Children's Script. The entire series was released to DVD in the United States on November 8, 2005. TeenNick, a channel that combined Noggin's The N with Nickelodeon's TEENick, aired reruns of Miracle's Boys throughout 2012.

Synopsis
The series follows the lives of two teenage boys and their older brother, who has to take responsibility for the boys after their parents die. The eldest Bailey brother, twenty-one-year-old Ty'ree (Pooch Hall), is a mail room manager at a publishing company. He was accepted into MIT prior to the events of the show, but declined the acceptance to raise his younger brothers. Charlie (Sean Nelson), the middle boy, has just gotten out of a juvenile detention facility and is mad at the universe. Once an avid pet lover and baseball fanatic, life behind bars has changed him. Lafayette (Julito McCullum), the youngest Bailey brother at age fourteen, loves and breathes baseball. However, his game has been out-of-sync since his mother's death. He goes on to play in a championship game, in which he faces an all-star team from Greenwich Village. The series follows the boys through the hardships of growing up on their own.

Cast

Main cast
 Pooch Hall as Ty'ree
 Sean Nelson as Charlie
 Julito McCullum as Lafayette

Supporting cast
 Jorge Posada and Tiki Barber as Baseball Coaches
 Jordan Puryear as Angelina
 Sasha Toro as Tamara
 Nancy Ticotin as Miracle

Episodes

Awards and nominations

References

External links
 

2000s American teen drama television series
2005 American television series debuts
2005 American television series endings
2000s American television miniseries
English-language television shows
The N original programming
Television shows based on American novels
Television series about brothers
Television series about orphans
Television series about teenagers
Television shows set in New York City